The Central Oklahoma Bronchos college football team competes in the National Collegiate Athletic Association (NCAA) Division II, representing the University of Central Oklahoma in the Mid-America Intercollegiate Athletics Association. The Bronchos have played their home games at Wantland Stadium in Edmond, Oklahoma since 1965.

The Bronchos claim two national championships. They have also recorded 27 total conference championships, and three undefeated, untied seasons. The Central Oklahoma football program is one of the most successful programs in history, with 607 wins, which is fourth All-time among Division II programs.

The Bronchos have played in the first Oklahoma Intercollegiate Conference, the Oklahoma Collegiate Athletic Conference, the second Oklahoma Intercollegiate Conference, at the NAIA level. Since joining NCAA Division II in 1988 the Bronchos have played as members of the Lone Star Conference, and the Mid-America Intercollegiate Athletics Association.

Notes

References

Central Oklahoma Bronchos

Central Oklahoma Bronchos football seasons